Surgical Meth Machine is an industrial metal album by Al Jourgensen's project of the same name. It was released on April 15, 2016. The album was conceived by Jourgensen and engineer Sam D'Ambruoso as a tribute to the late guitarist Mike Scaccia, who Jourgensen called "probably the best shredder guitar player who walked this planet" – to this end, the project was planned to resemble the song "Side FX Include Mikey's Middle Finger (TV 4)" from From Beer to Eternity, with all songs clocking over at least 220 beats per minute. The project changed direction, however, when Jourgensen moved from Texas to California and got a medical marijuana card; according to Jourgensen, after this, "the record seemed to slow down considerably."

Track listing
All songs written by Surgical Meth Machine except track 8 by Deborah Smith, Gerald V. Casale, Mark Mothersbaugh and Susan Schmidt.

Personnel
 Al Jourgensen – lead vocals, guitars, bass
 Sammy D'Ambruoso – rhythm guitar, programming, engineer, vocals
 Betty X, Jello Biafra and Sabina Koenig – additional vocals
 Steve Davis – management 
 Dave Donnelly – mastering  
 Eric Lothrop – photography 
 Ben Garcia – artwork

References

2016 albums
Albums produced by Al Jourgensen
Nuclear Blast albums